Nothorhina is a genus of beetles belonging to the family Cerambycidae.

The species of this genus are Palaearctic in distribution.

Extant Species
 Nothorhina gardneri Plavilstshikov, 1934 
 Nothorhina punctata (Fabricius, 1798)

Extinct Species
 ↑Nothorhina granulicollis Zang, 1905

References

Cerambycidae
Cerambycidae genera